This is a list of lichens in the genus Lecanora. A 2008 estimate places over 550 species in the genus. , Index Fungorum lists 245 species in the genus, 8 subspecies, 4 varieties and 4 formae.

A

Lecanora achroa 
Lecanora achrooides 
Lecanora addubitata 
Lecanora aitema 
Lecanora alba  – Australia
Lecanora albella 
Lecanora albellula 
Lecanora albocaesiella 
Lecanora alboflavida 
Lecanora alpigena 
Lecanora andina 
Lecanora annularis 
Lecanora appalachensis 
Lecanora arafurensis  – Australia
Lecanora arenisaxicola 
Lecanora argentata 
Lecanora argentea 
Lecanora argopholis 
Lecanora arnhemica 
Lecanora arthothelinella 
Lecanora atrella 
Lecanora atroanima 
Lecanora atromarginata 
Lecanora atrosulphurea 
Lecanora atroviridis 
Lecanora austrae-frigidae 
Lecanora austro-oceanica 
Lecanora austrocalifornica 
Lecanora austrointumescens  – Australia
Lecanora austrosorediosa  – Australia
Lecanora austrotropica

B
Lecanora barkmaniana 
Lecanora beaumanii 
Lecanora bicinctoidea 
Lecanora biformis 
Lecanora bogotana 
Lecanora boligera 
Lecanora brasiliana 
Lecanora brattiae 
Lecanora brodoana 
Lecanora brownii 
Lecanora brucei 
Lecanora bryospora

C

Lecanora cactacea  – Galápagos Islands
Lecanora cadubriae 
Lecanora caesiorubella 
Lecanora caesiorugosa 
Lecanora caesiosora 
Lecanora calabrica 
Lecanora californica 
Lecanora campestris 
Lecanora caperatica 
Lecanora carneolutescens 
Lecanora carpoides 
Lecanora casuarinophila 
Lecanora cavicola 
Lecanora cenisia 
Lecanora cerebriformis  – Galápagos Islands
Lecanora cerebrosorediata  – Galápagos Islands
Lecanora cerradoensis 
Lecanora chionocarpoides 
Lecanora chlarotera 
Lecanora chloroleprosa 
Lecanora chlorophaeodes 
Lecanora cinereofusca 
Lecanora circumborealis 
Lecanora coilocarpa 
Lecanora comonduensis 
Lecanora compallens  – western Europe
Lecanora concilianda 
Lecanora concilians 
Lecanora conferta 
Lecanora confusa 
Lecanora confusoides  – Galápagos Islands
Lecanora coniferarum 
Lecanora contractuloides  – Australia
Lecanora coppinsii 
Lecanora coppinsiorum 
Lecanora coronulans 
Lecanora corysta 
Lecanora crassithallina

D
Lecanora darlingiae 
Lecanora darwiniana  – Galápagos Islands
Lecanora demosthenesii  – southwestern North America
Lecanora dispersoareolata 
Lecanora dispersogranulata

E

Lecanora egranulosa 
Lecanora elapheia 
Lecanora elatinoides 
Lecanora elixii 
Lecanora emergens 
Lecanora epanora 
Lecanora epibryon 
Lecanora epirhoda 
Lecanora expallens

F
Lecanora farinacea 
Lecanora farinaria 
Lecanora fibrosa 
Lecanora fimbriatula 
Lecanora flavidocarnea 
Lecanora flavidofusca 
Lecanora flavidomarginata 
Lecanora flavopallida 
Lecanora flavoviridis 
Lecanora floridula  – Florida
Lecanora flotoviana 
Lecanora fluoroxylina  – Brazil
Lecanora formosa 
Lecanora formosula  – Australasia
Lecanora frustulosa 
Lecanora fuscescens 
Lecanora fuscobrunnea 
Lecanora fuscococcinea

G

Lecanora galactiniza 
Lecanora gangaleoides 
Lecanora gansuensis 
Lecanora geophila 
Lecanora girigangaensis  – India
Lecanora gisleriana 
Lecanora glabrata 
Lecanora gongensiana 
Lecanora griseofulva 
Lecanora guatemalensis 
Lecanora guderleyi  – southwestern North America

H

Lecanora hafelliana  – South Korea
Lecanora handelii 
Lecanora helicopis 
Lecanora helmutii 
Lecanora helva 
Lecanora herteliana  
Lecanora horiza  
Lecanora hyalinescens  
Lecanora hybocarpa  
Lecanora hypocrocinoides  
Lecanora hypofusca  
Lecanora hypoptella

I

Lecanora imperfecta 
Lecanora impressa 
Lecanora impudens 
Lecanora inaurata  – United States
Lecanora interjecta 
Lecanora intricata 
Lecanora intumescens

J
Lecanora jamesii  – Europe

K
Lecanora kalbiana 
Lecanora kalbii  – Galápagos Islands
Lecanora kansriae 
Lecanora kenyana  – Africa
Lecanora kohu  – New Zealand
Lecanora kurokawae

L

Lecanora labiosa 
Lecanora lacteola 
Lecanora lasalliae 
Lecanora latens 
Lecanora latro 
Lecanora laxa 
Lecanora layana 
Lecanora lecideopsis  – France
Lecanora legalloana 
Lecanora lendemeri 
Lecanora leproplaca 
Lecanora leprosa 
Lecanora leptacina 
Lecanora leptacinella 
Lecanora lichexanthona  – South America
Lecanora lichexanthoxylina  – Brazil
Lecanora lividocinerea 
Lecanora loekoesii  – South Korea
Lecanora lojkahugoi 
Lecanora louisianae 
Lecanora lugubris 
Lecanora luteomarginata

M

Lecanora magnussoniana 
Lecanora malagae  – Galápagos Islands
Lecanora margaritula 
Lecanora margarodes 
Lecanora marginata 
Lecanora markjohnstonii  – United States
Lecanora masana 
Lecanora maxima 
Lecanora mayrhoferi 
Lecanora melacarpella 
Lecanora melaleuca 
Lecanora melanommata 
Lecanora mellea 
Lecanora meridionalis 
Lecanora microloba  – Poland
Lecanora microphaea 
Lecanora mikuraensis 
Lecanora mobergiana  – Australia
Lecanora mosigiicola 
Lecanora mugambii 
Lecanora mughicola 
Lecanora mundula 
Lecanora munzii 
Lecanora muscigena   – South Georgia Island

N

Lecanora neodegelii 
Lecanora neonashii – Mexico
Lecanora neoqueenslandica 
Lecanora nohedensis 
Lecanora notatica  – South America
Lecanora nothocaesiella  
Lecanora novae-hollandiae

O

Lecanora oblutescens 
Lecanora ochica 
Lecanora ochroidea 
Lecanora ombligulata  – Galápagos Islands
Lecanora oreinoides 
Lecanora orientoafricana  – Africa
Lecanora orlovii 
Lecanora orosthea 
Lecanora orosthea

P

Lecanora pachysoma 
Lecanora pacifica 
Lecanora paddensis 
Lecanora pallidochlorina  – southwestern North America
Lecanora pangerangoensis 
Lecanora panis-erucae 
Lecanora pannonica 
Lecanora panticapaensis 
Lecanora parachroa 
Lecanora paramerae 
Lecanora parmelinoides 
Lecanora peninsularis 
Lecanora perconcinna 
Lecanora perconfusa 
Lecanora perithioides 
Lecanora phaeocardia 
Lecanora phaeophora 
Lecanora phaeostigma 
Lecanora physciella 
Lecanora physcielloides 
Lecanora placodina 
Lecanora placodiolica  – Australia
Lecanora planaica 
Lecanora plumosa 
Lecanora poliophaea 
Lecanora polytropa 
Lecanora praepostera 
Lecanora pringlei 
Lecanora printzenii 
Lecanora prolifera 
Lecanora prosecha 
Lecanora pseudachroa  – southwestern North America
Lecanora pseudargentata 
Lecanora pseudephebes 
Lecanora pseudodecorata 
Lecanora pseudogangaleoides 
Lecanora pseudomellea 
Lecanora pseudosarcopidoides 
Lecanora pueblae 
Lecanora pulicaris 
Lecanora puniceofusca

Q
Lecanora queenslandica 
Lecanora quercicola

R

Lecanora rabdotoides  – South America
Lecanora ramulicola 
Lecanora remota 
Lecanora rhypoderma 
Lecanora rouxii 
Lecanora rubina 
Lecanora rugosella 
Lecanora rupicola 
Lecanora rutilescens 
Lecanora ryanii  – southwestern North America

S

Lecanora sachsiana 
Lecanora salicicola 
Lecanora saligna 
Lecanora sanctae-helenae 
Lecanora sarcopidoides 
Lecanora saxigena 
Lecanora schindleri 
Lecanora scrobiculata 
Lecanora shangrilaensis  – China
Lecanora silvae-nigrae 
Lecanora simeonensis 
Lecanora sinensis 
Lecanora sinuosa  – western Europe
Lecanora sonorae 
Lecanora soralifera 
Lecanora solaris  – Altai Mountains, Russia
Lecanora sorediomarginata 
Lecanora sphaerospora 
Lecanora stanislai 
Lecanora stenotropa 
Lecanora stramineoalbida 
Lecanora strobilina 
Lecanora strobilinoides 
Lecanora subaurea 
Lecanora subaureoides  – Galápagos Islands
Lecanora subcarnea 
Lecanora subcavicola 
Lecanora subcoarctata 
Lecanora subcrenulata 
Lecanora subepulotica 
Lecanora subflava 
Lecanora subimmergens 
Lecanora subimmersa 
Lecanora subintricata 
Lecanora subjaponica 
Lecanora sublivescens 
Lecanora subloekoesii  – China
Lecanora subpiniperda 
Lecanora subpraesistens 
Lecanora subpurpurea 
Lecanora subravida 
Lecanora subrugosa 
Lecanora subsaligna 
Lecanora substerilis  – Eastern Europe
Lecanora substrobilina  
Lecanora substylosa 
Lecanora subtartarea 
Lecanora subtecta 
Lecanora subtjibodensis 
Lecanora subumbrina 
Lecanora subviridis  – South America
Lecanora sulfurescens 
Lecanora symmicta

T
Lecanora terpenoidea  – Galápagos Islands
Lecanora tesselina 
Lecanora thallophila 
Lecanora tjibodensis 
Lecanora toroyensis 
Lecanora transvaalensis  – South Africa
Lecanora tropica

U
Lecanora ulrikii  – Bhutan; Thailand
Lecanora umbrina 
Lecanora umbrosa 
Lecanora upretii  – India
Lecanora usneicola 
Lecanora ussuriensis

V

Lecanora vainioi 
Lecanora valesiaca  – China
Lecanora vinetorum 
Lecanora viridiatra 
Lecanora viridipruinosa 
Lecanora viriduloflava

W
Lecanora weii  – China
Lecanora wilsonii 
Lecanora wirthii

X
Lecanora xanthoplumosa  – South America
Lecanora xanthoplumosella 
Lecanora xanthosora 
Lecanora xanthostoma 
Lecanora xylophila

Z
Lecanora zeroensis

Formerly placed under the genus Lecanora
Lecanora aberrata is now Lecidea aberrata 
Lecanora actophila is now Myriolecis actophila 
Lecanora agardhiana is now Myriolecis agardhiana 
Lecanora albescens is now Polyozosia albescens 
Lecanora americana is now Aspicilia americana 
Lecanora andrewii is now Polyozosia andrewii 
Lecanora anopta is now Lecanoropsis anopta 
Lecanora antiqua is now Myriolecis antiqua 
Lecanora bandolensis is now Myriolecis bandolensis 
Lecanora bicincta is now Glaucomaria bicincta 
Lecanora collatolica is now Bapalmuia confusa 
Lecanora flowersiana is now Myriolecis flowersiana 
Lecanora fugiens is now Myriolecis fugiens 
Lecanora persimilis is now Myriolecis persimilis 
Lecanora phaedrophthalma is now Omphalodina phaedrophthalma 
Lecanora phryganitis is now Polycaulina phryganitis 
Lecanora pinguis is now Protoparmeliopsis pinguis 
Lecanora populicola is now Polyozosia populicola  
Lecanora pruinosa is now Polyozosia pruinosa 
Lecanora pseudistera is now Omphalodina pseudistera 
Lecanora tenera is now Cliostomum tenerum 
Lecanora thysanophora is now Verseghya thysanophora

References

Lecanora